Josh Schneider (born January 11, 1988) is an American competition swimmer. He is a two-time medalist at the FINA Short Course World Championships and a former American record holder in the 50-meter freestyle (short course).

Swimming career
As a college swimmer at the University of Cincinnati, Schneider was a one-time NCAA champion, winning the 50-yard freestyle in 2010.

At the 2010 FINA Short Course World Championships, Schneider won the bronze in the 50 m freestyle. Schneider, who was swimming in lane eight, only qualified for the final after winning a swim-off against Australian Kyle Richardson. Schneider also earned a gold medal in the 4×100 m medley relay for his contributions in the heats.

At the 2014 FINA World Swimming Championships (25 m) in Doha, Qatar, Schneider was part of the winning 4x50 Mixed Freestyle Relay. He also was part of the silver medal team for the Men's 4x50m Freestyle and the Men's 4x50 Medley.

At the 2015 Pan American Games in Toronto, Canada, Schneider won the 50m Freestyle with a time of 21.86. He also received a silver in the 4 × 100 m medley relay and a bronze in the 4 × 100 m freestyle relay.

Schneider has also won the inaugural two editions of the RCP Tiburon Sprint Classic, a 50-yard freestyle match race held in the backyard pool of swimming philanthropist Tod Spieker, in which the winner claims a $10,000 grand prize.

He currently serves as an assistant coach at his alma mater, the University of Cincinnati where he also trains under head varsity swim coach Mandy Commons-DiSalle.

Personal
Schneider was born in Cincinnati, Ohio in 1988, the son of Greg and Sue Schneider.  He is a 2006 graduate of Taylor High School in North Bend, Ohio.  In high school, besides swimming, he also participated in track, golf, and football.  Schneider attended the University of Cincinnati and graduated in 2010, majoring in business.  Schneider is sponsored by TYR.

References

External links
 
 
 

1988 births
Living people
American male freestyle swimmers
Cincinnati Bearcats men's swimmers
Medalists at the FINA World Swimming Championships (25 m)
Swimmers from Cincinnati
Swimmers at the 2015 Pan American Games
World record holders in swimming
Pan American Games gold medalists for the United States
Pan American Games medalists in swimming
Cincinnati Bearcats swimming coaches
Medalists at the 2015 Pan American Games